Danny Sprinkle (born October 12, 1976) is a former American college basketball player, currently the head coach at his alma mater, Montana State University, a member of the Big Sky Conference in NCAA Division I.

Playing career
A two-time all-state selection in Montana at Helena High School, Sprinkle played college basketball at Montana State in Bozeman, where he was conference freshman of the year in 1996, and earned all-league honors in 1997. He graduated as the school's seventh all-time leading scorer.

Coaching career
Sprinkle's first coaching job came in 2000 as an assistant at Cal State Northridge, where he stayed for six seasons. He returned to Montana State for a two-year stint as an assistant under new head coach Brad Huse, then went back to Northridge in 2008 for five seasons. Sprinkle joined Dedrique Taylor's staff at Cal State Fullerton in 2013, and was part of the Titans' NCAA tournament squad in 2018.

On April 4, 2019, Sprinkle was hired at his alma mater, succeeding Brian Fish, and is the 23rd head coach of the men's program at Montana State.

Head coaching record

References

External links
Montana State University Athletics – Danny Sprinkle

1976 births
Living people
American men's basketball coaches
American men's basketball players
Basketball coaches from Montana
Basketball players from Montana
Cal State Fullerton Titans men's basketball coaches
Cal State Northridge Matadors men's basketball coaches
College men's basketball head coaches in the United States
Montana State Bobcats men's basketball coaches
Montana State Bobcats men's basketball players
Sportspeople from Helena, Montana